Greg Burns may refer to:

 Greg Burns (American football) (born 1972), American football coach
 Greg Burns (Australian rules footballer) (born 1958), former Australian rules footballer
 Greg Burns (musician), American musician with Red Sparowes
 Greg Burns (radio personality), British radio personality, see The Geoff Show
 Greg Burns (rugby league) (born 1995), rugby league player

See also
 Greg Byrnes (born 1987), Australian rugby player